Yuanyang County (Hani: Yeiqyaq) is located in Honghe Prefecture in southeastern Yunnan province, China, along the Red River. It is well known for its spectacular rice-paddy terracing. In 2013, part of the county formed the Honghe Hani Rice Terraces World Heritage Site, the 45th World Heritage Site in China.

Overview
The majority of the inhabitants of the county are from the Hani ethnic group. The GDP of Yuanyang county in 2002 was 630 million Yuan. The administrative seat of the county is the town of Nansha (a.k.a. New Yuanyang) down in the Red River valley at an elevation of 240 meters. It is situated  towards the north-east of the former administrative seat Xinjie (a.k.a. To the south of Old Yuanyang, the town of Panzhihua is positioned near the top of another major valley of rice-terraces. There are a total of 928 settlements in Yuanyang county, 826 of them being inhabited by only one single ethnic group.

The town of Old Yuanyang is a Hani minority settlement atop a ridge of the Ailao mountain range at an elevation of around 1570 metres. It is a popular destination with photographers due to the vast areas of nearby mountains which have been cultivated into terraced rice paddies for at least the past 1300 years by the Hani people. Despite the overwhelming scenic beauty of its landscape and colourful local minorities, mass tourism has not developed in this region, mainly due to its remote location, lack of a nearby airport, and until fairly recent, relative inaccessibility due to bad road conditions.

The terraced areas of interest to visitors are mainly found between 1000 and 2000 metres above sea level. The winter temperatures here, although never freezing, are such that they only support one rice crop a year. After the harvest, from mid-September till mid-November depending on the elevation, the terraces are filled with water until April, when planting begins.

The vast majority of the ethnic minority women in Yuanyang county still wear traditional clothes as their daily attire. The main ethnic group is the Hani who share the region with several other minorities such as the Yi and Miao. Market days in the villages tend to be very colourful when the different minority groups in the vicinity, each in their own traditional costume, come together to trade and socialise.

Administrative divisions
Yuanyang County currently has 3 towns and 11 townships. 
3 towns
 Nansha
 Xinjie
 Niujiaozhai

11 townships

Geography

The climate of Yuanyang county is mainly central sub-tropical monsoon with wet summers and dry winters. Average temperatures range from 26 Celsius down in the Red river valley to 4 Celsius in the upper reaches of the mountains.

The closest large towns to the west of Yuanyang county are Shiping and Yuanjiang. Gejiu is the major town to the north-east and also the capital of Honghe prefecture.  directly to the north of Yuanyang lies Jianshui, a small city with interesting monuments. A few hours to the south-east of Yuanyang is Luchun, another major Hani minority settlement turned modern city.

Buses also connect Yuanyang with the town of Hekou and the border crossing with Vietnam (6 hours).

Climate

Ethnic groups
Hani people
Miao people
Yao people
Dai people
Zhuang people
Yi people
Han Chinese

Vertical distribution of the various ethnic minority groups
The Hani and Yi, the creators of the monumental rice terraced mountains which have made Yuanyang famous, are the original inhabitants of these regions. Both their languages belong to the Tibeto-Burman group. Their villages can mainly be found between 1300 and 1600 metres above sea level.

The Dai moved here 700 years ago, and the Zhuang 400 years ago. Both their languages belong to the Tai–Kadai language group. Their villages are situated in the warmer areas below 700 metres elevation, near and along the rivers. Their main crop is rice grown in paddy fields.

The Miao and Yao (of the Hmong–Mien language group) are fairly recent arrivals to the region, only settling here 200 and 270 years ago. Their villages are in the cooler and drier upland areas, between 1600 and 1800 metres above sea level, where they grow maize.

The Yuanyang County Gazetteer (1990:625, 633) lists the following ethnic groups and subgroups.
Hani
Luobi 
Luomian 
Awu 
Haoni 
Guohong 
Duoni 
Baihong 
Asong 
Yi
Nisu 
Bula  (Phula)
Alu 
Muji 
Miao
Yao
Zhuang
Dai

Hani ethnic subgroups are located in the following townships of Yuanyang County.
Gouhouzhi : in Zhongjiaozhai , Shalatuo , Ezha , Majie , Huangcaoling ; Malizhai ; Guangpingzhai in Tuanjie Township 
Alou : in Duoyishu , Xinjie 
Loubi  and Loumei : in Ganiang , Xincheng , Xinjie , Fengshuling , Daping 
Asu : in Zha'e , Huangcaoling , Huangmaoling 
Duoni : in Niujiaozhai ; Zha'e

Transportation
There is no train or plane available in Yuanyang. Taking a long-distance bus is the best way to get to Yuanyang. Normally there are three buses travelling from Kunming to Yuanyang every day. The buses depart from Kunming South Bus Station and arrive at Yuanyang Bus Station. It takes about 6 hours to get to Yuanyang from Kunming. 
There are buses also travelling to Yuanyang from Gejiu, Mengzi, Jianshui. For tourists who would like to transfer from Jianshui, they could take a train from Kunming to Jianshu and then take a long-distance bus from Jianshui to Yuanyang.

Gallery

See also
Terrace (agriculture)
Paddy field

Notes

Further reading
 ; a history of Yuanyang County in Chinese

External links

Yuanyang government website

County-level divisions of Honghe Prefecture